The Decoration for Exceptional Civilian Service may refer to:

Department of the Army Decoration for Exceptional Civilian Service
Department of the Air Force Decoration for Exceptional Civilian Service
Central Intelligence Agency Exceptional Service Medallion
Office of the Secretary of Defense Exceptional Civilian Service Award
Defense Contract Management Agency Exceptional Civilian Service Award
Defense Information Systems Agency Exceptional Civilian Service Medal
Defense Intelligence Agency Exceptional Civilian Service Medal
Defense Supply Agency Exceptional Civilian Service Award
Defense Threat Reduction Agency Exceptional Service Award
National Security Agency Exceptional Civilian Service Medal
Department of Energy Exceptional Service Medal
U.S. Customs and Border Protection Commissioners Exceptional Service Medal
Department of Justice Attorney General's Award for Exceptional Service
Environmental Protection Agency Gold Medal for Exceptional Service 
National Aeronautics and Space Administration (NASA) Exceptional Service Medal
Selective Service System Exceptional Service Medal